The brown-eared pheasant (Crossoptilon mantchuricum) is a large, 96– to 100-cm-long, dark brown pheasant endemic to the mountain forests of northeastern China (Shanxi and nearby provinces). The species was first described by Robert Swinhoe in 1863. It has stiff white ear coverts behind the eyes, which look like a moustache. The crown is black with red bare facial skin and its tail of 22 elongated, white feathers is curved, loose and dark-tipped. Both sexes are similar in plumage.

The rarest member in the genus Crossoptilon, its diet consists mainly of roots, bulbs, and plant matter. The female lays five to eight large, pale stone green eggs, which take 28 days to hatch.

Due to isolated populations, deforestation, and poaching (despite being a protected species), the brown eared pheasant is evaluated as vulnerable on the IUCN Red List of Threatened Species. It is listed on Appendix I of CITES.

See also
List of endangered and protected species of China

References

External links 
 BirdLife Species Factsheet
 Red Data Book

brown eared pheasant
Birds of China
Endemic birds of China
brown eared pheasant
brown eared pheasant